The BLH S8 was an  diesel-electric locomotive intended for use in yard switching. The Baldwin-Lima-Hamilton Corporation produced a total of 63 units (61 for United States railroads and 2 for use in Cuba) between 1951 and 1953. Of these, nine were "calf" units built for Oliver Iron Mining Company in Minnesota. A tenth calf had been built for them on order, but when delivery was refused, it was fitted with a cab, and converted to a regular S8.

Original owners

Preservation
Only two intact examples of the S-8 are known to survive today, one of which is owned by a railroad museum, while the other is the property of a railway historical society.

References

External links
 Baldwin S-8
 Preserved Baldwin and Lima Locomotives
 S-8 — Original Owners

B-B locomotives
S-08
Diesel-electric locomotives of the United States
Railway locomotives introduced in 1951
Locomotives with cabless variants
Standard gauge locomotives of the United States